This is an incomplete alphabetical list by surname of notable feminist economists, experts in the social science of feminist economics, past and present. Only economists with biographical articles in Wikipedia are listed here.

Feminist economists

A

 Bina Agarwal (born 1951), Indian development economist
 Randy Albelda (born 1955), American labor and welfare economist; her research interests include gender and race, public policies, economics of taxation, and poverty
 Sabina Alkire, welfare economist with an interest in ethics
 Iulie Aslaksen, Norwegian environmental economist
 Siobhan Austen, Australian economist researching gendered aspects of population ageing

B

 Eudine Barriteau (born 1954), Barbadian professor of gender and public policy, and deputy principal, at the Nita Barrow Unit within the Institute of Gender and Development Studies, University of the West Indies, Cave Hill, Barbados
 Robin L. Bartlett, American professor for the economics department of Denison University, Granville, Ohio
 Amrita Basu (born 1953), American academic specializing in South Asian politics, with a particular interest in women's movements and other social movements
 Carolyn Baylies (1947–2003), American sociologist, active in international development
 Lourdes Benería (born 1937), Spanish professor of economics at Cornell University's Department of City & Regional Planning
 Silvia Berger, Argentine president of the International Association for Feminist Economics (IAFFE), 2017–2018
 Barbara Bergmann (1927–2015), American, with an interest in social policy and equality
 Margunn Bjørnholt (born 1958), Norwegian sociologist, economist, and social psychologist
 Anders Borg, Swedish politician and former Minister for Finance
 Heather Boushey (born 1970), American senior economist with the Center for American Progress

C
 Cecilia Conrad (born 1955), African-American academic with a particular interest in the effects of race and gender on economic status

D
 Séverine Deneulin (born 1974), senior lecturer in International Development at the Department of Social and Policy Sciences, University of Bath

E
 Diane Elson (born 1946), British gender and development social scientist

F

 Marianne Ferber (1923–2013), American feminist economist, one of the first to confront Gary Becker's work on economics and the family
 Nancy Folbre (born 1952), focuses on family economics, non-market work and the economics of care
 Sakiko Fukuda-Parr (born 1950), Japanese development economist

G
 Jayati Ghosh (born 1955), Indian development economist
 Suman Ghosh (born 1972), Bengali film director and associate professor of economics at Florida Atlantic University
 Alicia Girón, Mexican president of the International Association for Feminist Economics (IAFFE), 2014–2015

H
 Lawrence Haddad (born 1959), British development economist
 Heidi Hartmann (born 1945), American founder and president of the Washington-based Institute for Women's Policy Research (IWPR), a research organization created to conduct women-centered, public policy research
 Susan Himmelweit (born 1948), British emeritus professor of economics for the Open University in the UK; member of the editorial boards of Feminist Economics and  Journal of Women, Politics & Policy
 Jane Humphries (born 1948), British professor of economic history and Fellow of All Souls College at the University of Oxford

J

 Joyce Jacobsen, American professor of economics at Wesleyan University
 Devaki Jain (born 1933), Indian feminist writer
 Jacqueline Jones (born 1948), American social historian

K
 Naila Kabeer (born 1950), Bangladeshi-born British social economist, research fellow and writer
 Ravi Kanbur (born 1954), British former director and lead author of the World Bank's World Development Report
 Deniz Kandiyoti (born 1944), Turkish-British, emeritus professor in development studies at the School of Oriental and African Studies, University of London
 Edith Kuiper (born 1960), assistant professor of economics at State University of New York at New Paltz

M

 Martha MacDonald, Canadian professor of economics, St Mary's University, Halifax, Nova Scotia, Canada
 Deirdre McCloskey, American professor of economics, history, English, and communication at the University of Illinois at Chicago (UIC)
 Ailsa McKay (1963–2014), professor of economics at Glasgow Caledonian University; advisor to the United Nations
 John Stuart Mill (1806–1873), British philosopher, political economist and civil servant

N
 Julie A. Nelson (born 1956), professor of economics at the University of Massachusetts Boston

O

 Şemsa Özar, Turkish president of the International Association for Feminist Economics (IAFFE) 2015–2016

P
 Virginia Penny (1826–1914), independent scholar from Louisville, Kentucky

R
 Ingrid Robeyns (born 1972), Dutch-Belgium, chair of the Ethics of Institutions at Utrecht University, Faculty of Humanities and the associated Ethics Institute
 Yana van der Meulen Rodgers (born 1966), Dutch professor and graduate director within the Women's and Gender Studies department of Rutgers University

S

Souad al-Sabah (born 1942), Kuwaiti economist and writer 
 Jolande Sap (born 1963), Dutch GreenLeft (GroenLinks) politician and former educator and civil servant
 Stephanie Seguino, American professor of economics at the College of Arts and Sciences, University of Vermont (UVM), Burlington, Vermont
 Amartya Sen (born 1933), Indian Nobel Prize winning economist and philosopher
 Jean Shackelford (born 1946), American professor of economics emerita at Bucknell University, Lewisburg, central Pennsylvania
 Rhonda Sharp (born 1953), Australian adjunct professor of economics at the University of South Australia and project team leader and chief researcher of the university's Hawke Research Institute and Research Centre for Gender Studies
 Agneta Stark (born 1946), Swedish vice chancellor of Dalarna University, Sweden
 Myra Strober (born 1940), American professor of education, emerita, for the school of education, at Stanford Graduate School of Business, Stanford, California

T

 Irene Tinker (born 1927), American founding Board president of the International Center for Research on Women, founder and director of the Equity Policy Center and co-founder of the Wellesley Center for Research on Women
 Rosalba Todaro, Chilean economist and senior researcher at the Centro de Estudios de la Mujer (Women's Studies Centre) in Santiago, Chile

W
 Marilyn Waring (born 1952), New Zealand politician
 Beatrice Webb (1858–1943), English sociologist, economist, socialist, labour historian and social reformer

Y
 Brigitte Young (born 1946), Austrian professor emeritus of international political economy at the Institute of Political Science, University of Münster, Germany

See also 
 
 Feminist economics
 Feminist Economics (journal)
 History of economic thought
 International Association for Feminist Economics
 Gender and development
 Economic inequality
 Intra-household bargaining
 Capability approach

Notes 

Economists
Feminist
Feminist economists